M. Panchaksarya Renukacharya is an Indian politician and film actor who is the Political Secretary to the Chief Minister of Karnataka Basavaraj Bommai. He also served as the Political Secretary to the Chief Minister B. S. Yediyurappa from 6 September 2019 to 26 July 2021. He is a current Member of Karnataka Legislative Assembly from Honnali Constituency from 2018. He is a member of the Bharatiya Janata Party.  He was the former Minister for Excise in the Government of Karnataka from 2008 to 2013.

References

Karnataka MLAs 2008–2013
Living people
People from Davanagere
Bharatiya Janata Party politicians from Karnataka
Karnataka MLAs 2018–2023
1961 births